The Frontiers of Flight Museum is an aerospace museum located in Dallas, Texas,  founded in November 1988 by William E. Cooper, Kay Bailey Hutchison, and Jan Collmer. Originally located within a terminal at Dallas Love Field, the museum now occupies a  building at the southeast corner of Love Field on Lemmon Avenue. The museum is an affiliate within the Smithsonian Affiliations program.

Aviation historian George E. Haddaway promoted the founding of the museum subsequent to donation of his extensive personal collection of aviation history books, journals, photographs, as well as archives to the University of Texas at Dallas as the nucleus of one of the world's finest aviation collections, the History of Aviation Collection.

The museum features an extensive collection of aviation history artifacts and vehicles, and focuses on the history of aviation and space exploration with an emphasis on the role of the Dallas/Fort Worth area.  Exhibits include the Apollo 7 Command Module; a World War I Sopwith Pup biplane replica; artifacts from the German airship Hindenburg and other airships; and over 200 World War II aircraft models.

Aircraft on display

 Bell TH-1L Iroquois
 Bell TH-13S Sioux
 Bell UH-1D Iroquois
 Boeing 737-200 nose section, Southwest Airlines livery.
 Boeing 737-300 registration N300SW, Southwest Airlines livery.
 Boeing-Stearman PT-17 Kaydet
 Bücker Bü 133 – replica
 Culver Dart GC
 Curtiss JN-4D
 de Havilland DH.82H Tiger Moth
 E-Systems XQM-93A
 Glasflügel BS-1
 Grumman EA-6B Prowler
 Laser 200
 LearAvia Lear Fan 2100
 Learjet 24D
 Lockheed T-33A
 Lockheed Martin F-16B Fighting Falcon
 LTV A-7 Corsair II
 Meyer's Little Toot
 Northrop T-38 Talon
 Piper PA-20 Pacer
 Pitts S-2B
 Republic F-105D Thunderchief
 Ryan PT-22 Recruit
 Shoestring F1 Racer
 Sopwith Pup – replica
 Texas-Temple Sportsman – sole surviving example
 Thorp T-18
 Vought RF-8G Crusader
 Vought V-173
 Wright Flyer – model

Gallery

See also
List of aerospace museums

References

External links 

 Frontiers of Flight Museum - official site
 Frontiers of Flight Museum on Google Arts & Culture

Aerospace museums in Texas
Museums in Dallas
Smithsonian Institution affiliates
Dallas Love Field